The following is a list of the species of the genus Coprinopsis in the family Psathyrellaceae. Coprinopsis was split out of the genus Coprinus based on molecular data. The species Coprinopsis cinerea is a model organism for mushroom-forming basidiomycota, and its genome has been sequenced completely.

Species 

 Coprinopsis acuminata (Romagn.) Redhead, Vilgalys & Moncalvo (2001)
 Coprinopsis aesontiensis A. Melzer, Ferisin & Dovana (2017)
 Coprinopsis africana (Pegler) Redhead, Vilgalys & Moncalvo (2001)
 Coprinopsis afrocinerea Mešić, Tkalčec, Čerkez, I. Kušan & Matočec (2018)
 Coprinopsis afronivea Desjardin & B.A. Perry (2016)
 Coprinopsis albiflavida Voto (2021)
 Coprinopsis alcobae (A. Ortega) Valade (2014)
 Coprinopsis alnivora (Bogart) Voto (2019)
 Coprinopsis alopecia (Lasch) La Chiusa & Boffelli (2017)
 Coprinopsis alutaceivelata (Bogart) Redhead, Vilgalys & Moncalvo (2001)
 Coprinopsis ammophilae (Courtec.) Redhead, Vilgalys & Moncalvo (2001)
 Coprinopsis annulopora (Enderle) P. Specht & H. Schub. (2013)
 Coprinopsis arachnoidea P. Voto (2019)
 Coprinopsis argentea (P.D. Orton) Redhead, Vilgalys & Moncalvo (2001)
 Coprinopsis asiaticiphlyctidospora Fukiharu & Horigome (2013)
 Coprinopsis atramentaria (Bull.) Redhead, Vilgalys & Moncalvo (2001)
 Coprinopsis austrofriesii (Redhead & Pegler) Redhead, Vilgalys & Moncalvo (2001)
 Coprinopsis austrophlyctidospora Fukiharu (2011)
 Coprinopsis babosiae L. Nagy, Vágvölgyi & Papp (2013)
 Coprinopsis bellula (Uljé) P. Roux & Eyssart. (2011)
 Coprinopsis bicornis (Uljé & Horvers) Redhead, Vilgalys & Moncalvo (2001)
 Coprinopsis bogartii Voto (2021)
 Coprinopsis brunneistragulata (Bogart) Redhead, Vilgalys & Moncalvo (2001)
 Coprinopsis brunneofibrillosa (Dennis) Redhead, Vilgalys & Moncalvo (2001)
 Coprinopsis bubalina (Bogart) Redhead, Vilgalys & Moncalvo (2001)
 Coprinopsis burkii (A.H. Sm.) Redhead, Vilgalys & Moncalvo (2001)
 Coprinopsis calospora (Bas & Uljé) Redhead, Vilgalys & Moncalvo (2001)
 Coprinopsis candidata (Uljé) Gminder & Böhning (2016)
 Coprinopsis candidolanata (Doveri & Uljé) Keirle, Hemmes & Desjardin (2004)
 Coprinopsis canoceps (Kauffman) Örstadius & E. Larss. (2015)
 Coprinopsis caracasensis (Dennis) Voto (2020)
 Coprinopsis caribaea (Pegler) Redhead, Vilgalys & Moncalvo (2001)
 Coprinopsis cerkezii Tkalčec, Mešić, I. Kušan & Matočec (2017)
 Coprinopsis cinchonensis (Murrill) Redhead, Vilgalys & Moncalvo (2001)
 Coprinopsis cineraria (Har. Takah.) Örstadius & E. Larss. (2015)
 Coprinopsis cinerea (Schaeff.) Redhead, Vilgalys & Moncalvo (2001)
 Coprinopsis cinereofloccosa (P.D. Orton) Redhead, Vilgalys & Moncalvo (2001)
 Coprinopsis clastophylla (Maniotis) Redhead, Vilgalys & Moncalvo (2001)
 Coprinopsis coniophora (Romagn.) Redhead, Vilgalys & Moncalvo (2001)
 Coprinopsis cortinata (J.E. Lange) Gminder (2010)
 Coprinopsis cothurnata (Godey) Redhead, Vilgalys & Moncalvo (2001)
 Coprinopsis cubensis (Berk. & M.A. Curtis) Redhead, Vilgalys & Moncalvo (2001)
 Coprinopsis dendrocystota Voto (2021)
 Coprinopsis depressiceps (Bogart) Redhead, Vilgalys & Moncalvo (2001)
 Coprinopsis discipes (Pat.) Voto (2020)
 Coprinopsis dolichocystidiata Voto (2021)
 Coprinopsis dryophila (Pat.) Voto (2019)
 Coprinopsis echinospora (Buller) Redhead, Vilgalys & Moncalvo (2001)
 Coprinopsis ephemeroides (DC.) G. Moreno (2010)
 Coprinopsis epichloea (Uljé & Noordel.) Redhead, Vilgalys & Moncalvo (2001)
 Coprinopsis episcopalis (P.D. Orton) Redhead, Vilgalys & Moncalvo (2001)
 Coprinopsis erythrocephala (Lév.) Redhead, Vilgalys & Moncalvo (2001)
 Coprinopsis extinctoria (Fr.) Redhead, Vilgalys & Moncalvo (2001)
 Coprinopsis fagnani (Raithelh.) Voto (2020)
 Coprinopsis fibrillosa (Berk. & Broome) Redhead, Vilgalys & Moncalvo (2001)
 Coprinopsis filamentifera (Kühner) Redhead, Vilgalys & Moncalvo (2001)
 Coprinopsis filamentiferoides Voto (2021)
 Coprinopsis filiformis (Berk. & Broome) Voto (2019)
 Coprinopsis fluvialis (Lancon. & Uljé) Redhead, Vilgalys & Moncalvo (2001)
 Coprinopsis foetidella (P.D. Orton) Atri, A. Kaur & M. Kaur (2014)
 Coprinopsis foetidella (P.D. Orton) A. Ruiz & G. Muñoz (2016)
 Coprinopsis friesii (Quél.) P. Karst. (1881)
 Coprinopsis fusispora L. Nagy, Vágvölgyi & Papp (2013)
 Coprinopsis geesterani (Uljé) Redhead, Vilgalys & Moncalvo (2001)
 Coprinopsis gelatinosa (D.A. Reid & Eicker) Voto (2020)
 Coprinopsis ghanensis P. Voto (2019)
 Coprinopsis gonophylla (Quél.) Redhead, Vilgalys & Moncalvo (2001)
 Coprinopsis goudensis (Uljé) Redhead, Vilgalys & Moncalvo (2001)
 Coprinopsis hawaiana P. Voto (2019)
 Coprinopsis herbivora (Singer) Redhead, Vilgalys & Moncalvo (2001)
 Coprinopsis herinkii (Pilát & Svrček) Redhead, Vilgalys & Moncalvo (2001)
 Coprinopsis heterocoma (Malençon) Redhead, Vilgalys & Moncalvo (2001)
 Coprinopsis hypsizyga (Singer) Voto (2020)
 Coprinopsis idae (Uljé) La Chiusa & Boffelli (2017)
 Coprinopsis igarashii Fukiharu & Kim. Shimizu (2015)
 Coprinopsis indicifoetidella P. Voto (2019)
 Coprinopsis insignis (Peck) Redhead, Vilgalys & Moncalvo (2001)
 Coprinopsis iocularis (Uljé) La Chiusa & Boffelli (2017)
 Coprinopsis jamaicensis (Murrill) Redhead, Vilgalys & Moncalvo (2001)
 Coprinopsis jonesii (Peck) Redhead, Vilgalys & Moncalvo (2001)
 Coprinopsis karwinicola (Grgur.) J.A. Simpson & Grgur. (2001)
 Coprinopsis kimurae (Hongo & Aoki) Redhead, Vilgalys & Moncalvo (2001)
 Coprinopsis krieglsteineri (Bender) Redhead, Vilgalys & Moncalvo (2001)
 Coprinopsis kubickae (Pilát & Svrček) Redhead, Vilgalys & Moncalvo (2001)
 Coprinopsis laanii (Kits van Wav.) Redhead, Vilgalys & Moncalvo (2001)
 Coprinopsis laciniatiloma Voto (2021)
 Coprinopsis lagopides (P. Karst.) Redhead, Vilgalys & Moncalvo (2001)
 Coprinopsis lagopus (Fr.) Redhead, Vilgalys & Moncalvo (2001)
 Coprinopsis lotinae (Picón) Picón (2011)
 Coprinopsis luteocephala (Watling) Redhead, Vilgalys & Moncalvo (2001)
 Coprinopsis macrocephala (Berk.) Redhead, Vilgalys & Moncalvo (2001)
 Coprinopsis macrocystidiata Voto (2021)
 Coprinopsis macropus (Berk. & Broome) Redhead, Vilgalys & Moncalvo (2001)
 Coprinopsis maculata (Dennis) Voto (2019)
 Coprinopsis marcescibilis (Britzelm.) Örstadius & E. Larss. (2008)
 Coprinopsis marcida (Bogart) Redhead, Vilgalys & Moncalvo (2001)
 Coprinopsis martinii (P.D. Orton) Redhead, Vilgalys & Moncalvo (2001)
 Coprinopsis maysoidispora (Redhead & Traquair) Redhead, Vilgalys & Moncalvo (2001)
 Coprinopsis melanthina (Fr.) Örstadius & E. Larss. (2015)
 Coprinopsis mexicana (Murrill) Redhead, Vilgalys & Moncalvo (2001)
 Coprinopsis mitrispora (Bohus) L. Nagy, Vágvölgyi & Papp (2013)
 Coprinopsis musae Örstadius & E. Larss. (2015)
 Coprinopsis myceliocephala (M. Lange) Redhead, Vilgalys & Moncalvo (2001)
 Coprinopsis mycophila Voto (2021)
 Coprinopsis narcotica (Batsch) Redhead, Vilgalys & Moncalvo (2001)
 Coprinopsis natarajanii Devadatha, Kumaresan & V.V. Sarma (2021)
 Coprinopsis nemoralis (Bender) La Chiusa & Boffelli (2017)
 Coprinopsis neocinerea P.T. Nguyen, Fukiharu & K. Shimizu (2019)
 Coprinopsis neolagopus (Hongo & Sagara) Redhead, Vilgalys & Moncalvo (2001)
 Coprinopsis neophlyctidospora Raut, Fukiharu & A. Suzuki (2011)
 Coprinopsis neotropica (Redhead & Pegler) Redhead, Vilgalys & Moncalvo (2001)
 Coprinopsis nevillei Guy García & Vellinga (2010)
 Coprinopsis nigra Voto (2021)
 Coprinopsis nivea (Pers.) Redhead, Vilgalys & Moncalvo (2001)
 Coprinopsis novorugosobispora Fukiharu & Yamakoshi (2013)
 Coprinopsis ochraceolanata (Bas) Redhead, Vilgalys & Moncalvo (2001)
 Coprinopsis pachyderma (Bogart) Redhead, Vilgalys & Moncalvo (2001)
 Coprinopsis pachysperma (P.D. Orton) Redhead, Vilgalys & Moncalvo (2001)
 Coprinopsis pachysphaerophora Voto (2021)
 Coprinopsis paleotropica (Redhead & Pegler) Redhead, Vilgalys & Moncalvo (2001)
 Coprinopsis pallidipygata Voto (2021)
 Coprinopsis pannucioides (J.E. Lange) Örstadius & E. Larss. (2008)
 Coprinopsis papagoensis (Lindsey & Gilb.) Redhead, Vilgalys & Moncalvo (2001)
 Coprinopsis parvilurida Voto (2021)
 Coprinopsis pentagonospora Voto (2021)
 Coprinopsis pernambucensis Voto (2020)
 Coprinopsis phaeocalyptrata Voto (2021)
 Coprinopsis phaeochlamys Voto (2021)
 Coprinopsis phaeopunctata (Esteve-Rav. & A. Ortega) Valade (2014)
 Coprinopsis phaeospora (P. Karst.) P. Karst. (1881)
 Coprinopsis phlyctidospora (Romagn.) Redhead, Vilgalys & Moncalvo (2001)
 Coprinopsis picacea (Bull.) Redhead, Vilgalys & Moncalvo (2001)
 Coprinopsis piepenbroekorum (Uljé & Bas) Redhead, Vilgalys & Moncalvo (2001)
 Coprinopsis pilosotomentosa (Bender) La Chiusa & Boffelli (2017)
 Coprinopsis pinguispora (Bogart) Redhead, Vilgalys & Moncalvo (2001)
 Coprinopsis platypus (Berk.) Voto (2019)
 Coprinopsis poliomalla (Romagn.) Doveri, Granito & Lunghini (2005)
 Coprinopsis psammophila Mešić & Tkalčec (2019)
 Coprinopsis pseudocortinata (Locq. ex Cacialli, Caroti & Doveri) Doveri, Granito & Lunghini (2005)
 Coprinopsis pseudofriesii (Pilát & Svrček) Redhead, Vilgalys & Moncalvo (2001)
 Coprinopsis pseudomarcescibilis Heykoop, G. Moreno & P. Alvarado (2017)
 Coprinopsis pseudonivea (Bender & Uljé) Redhead, Vilgalys & Moncalvo (2001)
 Coprinopsis pseudoradiata (Kühner & Joss. ex Watling) Redhead, Vilgalys & Moncalvo (2001)
 Coprinopsis psychromorbida (Redhead & Traquair) Redhead, Vilgalys & Moncalvo (2001)
 Coprinopsis pulchricaerulea T. Lebel, Padamsee & T.W. May (2022)
 Coprinopsis punctata (Kalchbr.) Voto (2019)
 Coprinopsis quinaultensis Voto (2021)
 Coprinopsis radiata (Bolton) Redhead, Vilgalys & Moncalvo (2001)
 Coprinopsis radicans (Romagn.) Redhead, Vilgalys & Moncalvo (2001)
 Coprinopsis radicata (Cleland) J.A. Simpson & Grgur. (2001)
 Coprinopsis ramosocystidiata (Bender) La Chiusa & Boffelli (2017)
 Coprinopsis rhizophora (Kawam. ex Hongo & K. Yokoy.) D.J. Schaf. & B. Douglas (2020)
 Coprinopsis romagnesiana (Singer) Redhead, Vilgalys & Moncalvo (2001)
 Coprinopsis rugosobispora (J. Geesink & Imler ex Walleyn) A. Melzer & Schößler (2016)
 Coprinopsis rugosomagnispora Gierczyk, Pietras, Piątek, Gryc, Czerniawski & Rodr.-Flakus (2017)
 Coprinopsis saccharomyces (P.D. Orton) P. Roux & Guy García (2006)
 Coprinopsis saccospora (Singer) Voto (2020)
 Coprinopsis sclerotiger (Watling) Redhead, Vilgalys & Moncalvo (2001)
 Coprinopsis sclerotiorum (Horvers & de Cock) Redhead, Vilgalys & Moncalvo (2001)
 Coprinopsis scobicola (P.D. Orton) Redhead, Vilgalys & Moncalvo (2001)
 Coprinopsis semitalis (P.D. Orton) Redhead, Vilgalys & Moncalvo (2001)
 Coprinopsis siskiyouensis Voto (2021)
 Coprinopsis spilospora (Romagn.) Redhead, Vilgalys & Moncalvo (2001)
 Coprinopsis stangliana (Enderle, Bender & Gröger) Redhead, Vilgalys & Moncalvo (2001)
 Coprinopsis stercorea (Fr.) Redhead, Vilgalys & Moncalvo (2001)
 Coprinopsis striata (Bogart) Redhead, Vilgalys & Moncalvo (2001)
 Coprinopsis strossmayeri (Schulzer) Redhead, Vilgalys & Moncalvo (2001)
 Coprinopsis subaquatica Voto (2021)
 Coprinopsis subcurta (Thiers) Voto (2020)
 Coprinopsis subcylindrosporus (E. Ludw.) U. Täglich (2018)
 Coprinopsis subdomestica (Murrill) D. Wächt. & A. Melzer (2020)
 Coprinopsis submicrospora (Heykoop & G. Moreno) Örstadius & E. Larss. (2015)
 Coprinopsis subtigrinella (Dennis) Redhead, Vilgalys & Moncalvo (2001)
 Coprinopsis superba Voto (2021)
 Coprinopsis sylvicola (Bogart) Redhead, Vilgalys & Moncalvo (2001)
 Coprinopsis tectispora (Bogart) Redhead, Vilgalys & Moncalvo (2001)
 Coprinopsis tigrina (Pat.) Redhead, Vilgalys & Moncalvo (2001)
 Coprinopsis tigrinella (Boud.) Redhead, Vilgalys & Moncalvo (2001)
 Coprinopsis trispora (Kemp & Watling) Redhead, Vilgalys & Moncalvo (2001)
 Coprinopsis tuberosa (Quél.) Doveri, Granito & Lunghini (2005)
 Coprinopsis udicola Örstadius, A. Melzer & E. Larss. (2015)
 Coprinopsis uliginicola (McKnight & A.H. Sm.) Örstadius & E. Larss
 Coprinopsis undulata (Bogart) Redhead, Vilgalys & Moncalvo (2001)
 Coprinopsis urticicola (Berk. & Broome) Redhead, Vilgalys & Moncalvo (2001)
 Coprinopsis utrifer (Joss. ex Watling) Redhead, Vilgalys & Moncalvo (2001)
 Coprinopsis variegata (Peck) Redhead, Vilgalys & Moncalvo (2001)
 Coprinopsis vermiculifer (Joss. ex Dennis) Redhead, Vilgalys & Moncalvo (2001)
 Coprinopsis verticillata (Schulz-Wedd.) Redhead, Vilgalys & Moncalvo (2001)
 Coprinopsis villosa L. Nagy, Desjardin, Vägvölgyi & Papp (2012)
 Coprinopsis xantholepis (P.D. Orton) Redhead, Vilgalys & Moncalvo (2001)
 Coprinopsis xenobia (P.D. Orton) Redhead, Vilgalys & Moncalvo (2001)

References

Coprinopsis species